A fauteuil is a style of open-armchair with a primarily exposed wooden frame originating in France during the early 17th century. A fauteuil is made of wood and frequently with carved relief ornament. It is typically upholstered on the seat, the seat back and on the arms (manchettes).  Some fauteuils have a valenced front seat rail which is padding that extends slightly over the apron. The exposed wooden elements are often gilded or otherwise painted.

See also
Bergere
Couch
Louis XVI

Chairs

pl:Fotel